Farhana Amin Ratna (better known by her stage name Nuton) is a Bangladeshi film actress. She was a dancer from Kishoreganj, Bangladesh. She debuted with the film Nuton Prabhat.

Career
Nuton debuted with the film Nuton Probhat (1969). Later, she got her biggest through in the patriotic film Ora Egaro Jon (1972). Her portrayal of a wretched housewife earned her nationwide recognition. Nuton is notable for her negative role as a vamp in the 1988 film Ranga Bhabi. She was awarded Bangladesh National Film Award for Best Supporting Actress in 1991 for her role in Streer Paona. In 1983, Nuton became the first model of the commercial of Lux in Bangladesh.

Personal life
Nuton married film producer Ruhul Amin Babul in 1978.

Filmography

Television appearances

Awards

References

External links
 Nuton at the Bangla Movie Database
 Nuton at the Bangladesh Film Archive

 

Bangladeshi film actresses
Living people
Best Supporting Actress National Film Award (Bangladesh) winners
Year of birth missing (living people)
Place of birth missing (living people)
Best Actress Bachsas Award winners
Best Supporting Actress Bachsas Award winners